Sparaxis tricolor, known by the common names wandflower, harlequin flower, and sparaxis, is a bulb-forming perennial plant that grows in well-drained sunny soil. It gained its name from its colorful flowers which are bi- or tri-coloured with a golden centre and a small ring of brown surrounded by another colour.

The plant is native to southern Africa. It is present in California and Australia as an introduced species after having escaped from garden cultivation.

References

External links
Jepson Manual Treatment
USDA Plants Profile
Flora of North America
Photo gallery

tricolor
Flora naturalised in Australia
Plants described in 1794
Flora of Southern Africa